Codnor Park and Selston railway station was a former railway station to serve the villages of Codnor Park and Selston on the border between Derbyshire and Nottinghamshire and was actually in Jacksdale.
In some timetables it was listed as Codnor Park and Selston for Ironville and Jacksdale.

It was opened by the Great Northern Railway (Great Britain) on its Derbyshire Extension in 1875-6 and closed in 1963.

It lay on the branch from Awsworth Junction,  to Pinxton, Codnor Park being important for an ironworks belonging to the Butterley Company.

Codnor Park and Ironville railway station opened nearby in 1847 on the Midland Railway Erewash Valley Line.
The tracks are still in place today; however, the line is not in use. They can be seen from trains running between Langley Mill and Alfreton

References

Former Great Northern Railway stations
Railway stations in Great Britain opened in 1876
Railway stations in Great Britain closed in 1963
Disused railway stations in Nottinghamshire
Ashfield District